Glukhovo-1 is a rural locality (a village) in Zalesskoye Rural Settlement, Ustyuzhensky District, Vologda Oblast, Russia. The population was 5 as of 2002.

Geography 
Glukhovo-2 is the nearest rural locality.

References 

Rural localities in Ustyuzhensky District